The Council of Churches of Malaysia (CCM) is an ecumenical fellowship of Churches and Christian organisations in Malaysia. It is one of the three constituent members of the Christian Federation of Malaysia.

It is affiliated with the Commission on World Mission and Evangelism of the World Council of Churches and a member of the Christian Conference of Asia. It also participates in the Malaysian Consultative Council of Buddhism, Christianity, Hinduism, Sikhism and Taoism as part of the Christian Federation of Malaysia.

History
In 1947, the Malayan Christian Council was mooted and officially inaugurated on 9 January 1948 under the leadership of John Leonard Wilson, the Anglican Bishop of Singapore, with Hobart Baumann Amstutz of the Methodist Church acting as General Secretary to promote Christian unity among the Churches and Christian organisations in Malaya and Singapore.

Despite the 1963 federation of the British Crown Colonies of Singapore, North Borneo, and Sarawak with the Federation of Malaya into the new nation of Malaysia, the Malayan Christian Council continued to function using the old name. In 1967, the Malayan Christian Council was renamed the Council of Churches of Malaysia and Singapore. In view of Malaysia and Singapore having separated and become independent sovereign nations, it was considered desirable to have separate Councils of Churches for each nation, therefore, the Council was divided into 2 national organisations; the current Council of Churches of Malaysia and the National Council of Churches of Singapore in 1975.

Basis and objectives

Basis
The Council is founded
 on a common belief that God has revealed His eternal purpose for mankind in His Son Jesus Christ, through the Holy Spirit. Its members accept the scriptures of Old and New Testaments as the supreme standard of faith and practice, and confess their common faith as expressed in the Apostles' and Nicene Creeds
 on the acceptance of the principal that the Church is in the Christian enterprise that the local congregation is basic to its life and witness, and that evangelism is its primary task
 as an association of Churches, and other Christian organisations, each believing that it is Christ's will that His Body, the Church should again be visibly one and each desiring to work towards this end
 as an association of co-operating members, each of which determines its own policy and action

Objectives
The objectives of the Council are
 to offer itself as an instrument or agency to the Churches in Malaysia whereby they can more and more do together everything except what irreconcilable differences of sincere conviction compel them to do separately
 to show forth among its members that Christian unity which is God's gift to His people in Jesus Christ, and by common prayer, study, consultation and action, promote the Church's mission in Malaysia and the World
 through common consultation and action to form Christian public opinion and bring it to bear on the moral, social, national and international problems of the day, particularly those affecting the life and welfare of the peoples of Malaysia
 to promote discussion and action among Churches in Malaysia towards Church union
 to provide an agency through which governments in Malaysia both federal and state, may consult with member-churches and organisations on matters of common concern to all member bodies of the Council
 to maintain fellowship with other Christian Councils or Council of Churches of other countries and with such ecumenical bodies as the Council may decide, and in particular to fulfil its obligations as an affiliated member of the World Council of Churches and the Christian Conference of Asia

Constituents

Member Churches

Associate Members

Affiliate Members

Leadership

Presidents

General Secretaries

See also
 Christianity in Malaysia
 Christianity in Singapore
 Ecumenism

External links
 Council of Churches of Malaysia
 Profile of CCM at the World Council of Churches website

Churches in Malaysia
Christianity in Singapore
Malaysia
Malaysia
Christian organizations established in 1948